Tagetes tenuifolia, the signet marigold, golden marigold or lemon marigold, is a species of the wild marigold in the family Asteraceae. It is widespread across most of Mexico as well as Central America, Colombia, and Peru.

The plant produces many small bright yellow flower heads in a flat-topped array, each head with five ray florets and 7–9 disc florets.

Uses

Culinary
The plant's edible flowers can be used as a garnish because of its lemon-like flavor.

Gardening
Marigolds are regarded as one of the easiest plants to grow. They are very hardy, and may survive minor frosts. The plant is well suited to a mostly sunny position, and fairly well draining soil. Overly fertile soil may cause the plants to become bushy and produce less flowers. Marigolds come in a variety of colours, but mostly yellows and oranges, flowering in the middle of Summer. They can be planted out when there's no more risk of frosts.  They can be purchased from most nurseries, and seeds are readily available in stores. It is often used as a companion plant for its insect-repelling properties.

Other
Some species of Tagetes possess a characteristic scent, which repels insects such as mosquitoes, small animals and smaller, burrowing insects. Tagetes tenuifolia is one of these and is often planted near small creeks or puddle prone areas to repel bugs, especially mosquitoes. It was also found that the Tagetes tenuifolia contains thiophene which is a biocidal compound that acts as a natural pesticide to control nematodes in the field.

Traditional Medicine 
Traditionally, the plants were decocted and used as a treatment for snakebites in Mexico, and the leaves were used as medicine for bruises in Peru. Tagetes tenuifolia could also be used as treatments for stomach flu in terms of indigestion, constipation, infant diarrhea.

References

External links
line drawing for Flora of Panama

tenuifolia
Flora of Mexico
Flora of Central America
Flora of South America
Plants described in 1793
Taxa named by Antonio José Cavanilles